Acanthella is a genus of two species of flowering plants in the family Melastomataceae. This genus is native to tropical South America.

Species
Acanthella pulchra Gleason. Venezuela
Acanthella sprucei  Hook.f. Brazil

References
Groger A, Renner SS. 1997. Leaf anatomy and ecology of the Guayana endemics Acanthella sprucei and A. pulchra (Melastomataceae). BioLlania ed. especial no.6. 369-374 (1997)

External links
Catalog of Botanical Illustrations, Department of Botany, Smithsonian Institution, Plate No. 700 Acanthella sprucei extracted from Flora de Venezuela.

Melastomataceae
Melastomataceae genera
Neotropical realm flora
Taxa named by Joseph Dalton Hooker